Alejandro Falla was the defending champion but did not compete this year.Santiago Giraldo won in the final 6–3, 6–3 against Paolo Lorenzi.

Seeds

Draw

Finals

Top half

Bottom half

References
Qualifying Singles
Main Draw

Seguros Bolivar Open Pereira - Singles
2010 Singles